Ganado Airport  was a public-use airport located  east of the central business district of Ganado, in Apache County, Arizona, United States. It is privately owned by the Navajo Nation government.

This airport was included in the FAA's National Plan of Integrated Airport Systems for 2009–2013, which categorized it as a general aviation facility.

Facilities 
It has one runway designated

References

External links 
 Ganado Airport (85V) at Arizona DOT Airport Directory
 Aerial image as of 8 April 1992 from USGS The National Map

Defunct airports in the United States
Airports in Apache County, Arizona
Navajo Nation airports